Chaoqi is a traditional Chinese snack. It is the dough pieces covered with Guanyin Clay, a kind of soil. The primary raw materials for making Chaoqi are flour, edible oil, egg, sugar, salt, and sesame. It has various flavors like milk flavor, sesame flavor, and five spices flavor.

History 
Chaoqi originated in Yuanqu County, Shanxi province, China over 4,000 years ago. Due to the lack of modern transportation back then, journeys were long. They may feel nostalgic and unaccustomed to the climate outside of their hometown. As a result, they will bring Chaoqi with them because the dough is produced by the water, flour and soil from their hometown. Chaoqi gets easily spoiled and needs a preservative. To save the dough better, it is covered with an outer layer of Guanyin Clay (A.K.A Kaolinite). Chaoqi was listed as an intangible cultural heritage of Shanxi Province on April 24, 2009.

Origin of the Snack 
Chaoqi has some legendary origins. All of the legends are related to Mount Wangwu, a mountain located 45 kilometers (28 mi) north west of Jiyuan City in China’s Henan province. On top of the mountain's main peak is a stone altar where the legendary Yellow Emperor offered sacrifices to the gods.

The Legend of Yugong 
In traditional Chinese legend, The Foolish Old Man Removes the Mountains, one of the mountains that Yugong moved is Mount Wangwu. To move the mountain, he could only make one round trip between the mountain and his home in a year. The food he brought on the road is Chaoqi.

The Legend of Guanyin 

In ancient times, in the area of Mount Wangwu, a strange disease suddenly spread. People got the symptom of gastrointestinal discomfort, but no one could be cured. They  worshipped the heavens to seek help from God. Guanyin was moved and descended to the world. She took the earth from the top of the Temple of Heaven and fried the dough in the earth. She distributed it to the sick. Then those people recovered in a few days. After this, people called the soil "Guanyin Clay" and handed down this snack-making process through the generations.

What is Guanyin Clay? 
The Legend of Guanyin aside, in the past, the poor often depended on eating Guanyin clay to survive during the famine; this kind of clay can satisfy their hunger, but cannot be digested and absorbed by the human body. After eating, it will have bloating and make it difficult to defecate. Eating is not fatal; although you won't be hungry, people still die because of lack of nutrition. During the famine years, because of eating Guanyin clay, the belly was bloated and unable to defecate, and countless people were suffocated to death.

Health value and hazards 

Chaoqi fried with a unique soil called Guanyin Clay, also called Kaolinite, a kind of Bentonite. This dirt is found at Loess Plateau, Shanxi. It is a kind of medicinal material recorded in Compendium of Materia Medica. In the past, it was called Bai'e. Kaolinite contains the element of calcium, which is good for people's bones and blood pressure. The main benefits include promoting adolescents' skeleton growth, relieving osteoporosis, and concreting blood to lower blood pressure. Guanyin Clay can also draw out impurities and improve the immunity of the human's gut and stomach because the clay has adhesiveness, enabling the adhesion of the impurities in the human's body before they get discharged. The process of removing hazardous substances improves people's immunity. Chaoqi can also cure diarrhea and nausea thanks to the binding effect of Guanyin Clay. However, if people overeat Guanyin Clay, it will lead to indigestion and become a poison because this clay is indigestible.

Chaoqi only uses a small quantity of Guanyin Clay and is heated at a high temperature so that Chaoqi is said to be beneficial to people's health.

Making procedure 

 Choose Guanyin Clay and pulverize the soil block on the stone roll. Use the sieve to filter the soil and leave the fine earth. Use the fire to burn the clay.
Mix flour with seasoning to make the dough. Roll out the dough with a rolling pin and cut it into pieces.
Put the dough pieces into the soil at high temperature and fry.
Knock the fried dough pieces to knock off the excess dirt.

References 

Shaanxi cuisine